The 1985 Ebel U.S. Pro Indoor was a men's tennis tournament played on indoor carpet courts that was part of the Super Series of the 1985 Nabisco Grand Prix. It was played at the Spectrum in Philadelphia, Pennsylvania in the United States from January 21 to January 28, 1985. First-seeded John McEnroe won his fourth consecutive singles title at the event.

Prize money

*per team

Finals

Singles

 John McEnroe defeated  Miloslav Mečíř 6–3, 7–6, 6–1
 It was McEnroe's 1st title of the year and the 107th of his career.

Doubles

 Joakim Nyström /  Mats Wilander defeated  Wojciech Fibak /  Sandy Mayer 3–6, 6–2, 6–2
 It was Nyström's 1st title of the year and the 7th of his career. It was Wilander's 1st title of the year and the 19th of his career.

References

External links
 ITF tournament edition details

Ebel U.S. Pro Indoor
U.S. Pro Indoor
U.S. Professional Indoor
U.S. Professional Indoor
U.S. Professional Indoor